is a Prefectural Natural Park in southern Chiba Prefecture, Japan. The park spans the municipalities of Ichihara, Kamogawa, Kimitsu, and Ōtaki.

See also
 National Parks of Japan

References

External links
  Map of Yōrō Keikoku Okukiyosumi Prefectural Natural Park
 Yōrō Keikoku Ryokan Kumiai

Parks and gardens in Chiba Prefecture
Protected areas established in 1935
1935 establishments in Japan